The Trafoier Eiswand is a mountain in the Ortler Alps on the border between South Tyrol and the Province of Sondrio, Italy.

References 
 Peter Holl: Alpenvereinsführer Ortleralpen, 9. Auflage, München 2003, 
 Zeitschrift des Deutschen und Oesterreichischen Alpenvereins, Band V, Seite 340, München 1874
 Eduard Richter (Redaktion): Die Erschließung der Ostalpen, II. Band, Verlag des Deutschen und Oesterreichischen Alpenvereins, Berlin, 1894
 Casa Editrice Tabacco, Udine: Carta topografica 1:25.000, Blatt 08, Ortles-Cevedale/Ortlergebiet

Mountains of the Alps
Mountains of South Tyrol
Alpine three-thousanders
Ortler Alps